Robincroft is a historic mansion in Nashville, Tennessee, U.S.. It was built in 1908 for Thomas M. Robinson, the owner of the Robinson McGill Carriage Company, a baby carriage company. It has been listed on the National Register of Historic Places since July 10, 1978.

References

Houses on the National Register of Historic Places in Tennessee
Houses completed in 1908
Houses in Nashville, Tennessee
1908 establishments in Tennessee